Gimpo Gong clan was one of the Korean clans. Their Bon-gwan was in Gimpo, Gyeonggi Province. According to the research in 2000, the number of Gimpo Gong clan was 2401. He was a subordinate of Confucius, and he was a descendant of Lu's royal family who was a descendant of Gong Ha su.  was one of the Eight Scholars in Tang dynasty, but he became Gimpo Gong clan's founder after he was naturalized in Silla in 755 in order to avoid the conflicts named An Lushan Rebellion in Tang dynasty during Emperor Xuanzong of Tang's reign.

See also 
 Korean clan names of foreign origin
 Muncheon Gong clan

References

External links 
 

 
Korean clan names of Chinese origin